Everette William Anderson (born August 9, 1948, in Parkersburg, West Virginia) is an American politician and a Republican member of the West Virginia House of Delegates representing District 8 since January 1993.

Education
Anderson earned his BA from Marshall University and his MA from West Virginia University.

Elections
2012 Anderson was unopposed for the May 8, 2012 Republican Primary, winning with 1,531 votes, and won the three-way November 6, 2012 General election with 4,842 votes (66.8%) against Democratic nominee Denzil Malone and Independent candidate Bob Buchanan.
1990s Anderson was initially elected in the 1992 Republican Primary and the November 3, 1992 General election and re-elected in the general elections of November 8, 1994 and November 5, 1996.
1998 Anderson was unopposed for both the 1998 Republican Primary and the November 3, 1998 General election.
2000 Anderson was unopposed for the 2000 Republican Primary and won the November 7, 2000 General election against Democratic nominee Pat Criss.
2002 Anderson was unopposed for the 2002 Republican Primary and won the November 5, 2002 General election against Democratic nominee Becky Sutphin.
2004 Anderson was challenged in the 2004 Republican Primary but won, and was unopposed for the November 2, 2004 General election.
2006 Anderson was unopposed for both the 2006 Republican Primary and the November 7, 2006 General election.
2008 Anderson was unopposed for the May 13, 2008 Republican Primary, winning with 1,541 votes, and won the November 4, 2008 General election with 5,023 votes (67.3%) against Democratic nominee Charles Webb.
2010 Anderson was unopposed for both the May 11, 2010 Republican Primary, winning with 1,343 votes, and the November 2, 2010 General election, winning with 4,530 votes.

References

External links
Official page at the West Virginia Legislature

Everette Anderson at Ballotpedia
E. W. 'Bill' Anderson Jr. at OpenSecrets
E. W. 'Bill' Anderson Jr. Campaign Committee at OpenSecrets

1948 births
Living people
Marshall University alumni
Republican Party members of the West Virginia House of Delegates
Politicians from Parkersburg, West Virginia
People from Williamstown, West Virginia
United States Air Force airmen
West Virginia University alumni
21st-century American politicians